Adrianopolis may refer to:

 Adrianopolis, an old name for the city of Edirne, Turkey
 Adrianópolis, a municipality in the state of Paraná in the Southern Region of Brazil
Adrianópolis (Manaus), a neighborhood in Manaus, Amazonas, Brazil.

See also
 Hadrianopolis (disambiguation)